"Getting Good" is a song recorded by American country music singer Lauren Alaina. It was released on October 7, 2019 as the second single from her EP of the same name, and the version with Trisha Yearwood was later included on the tracklisting for her third studio album, Sitting Pretty on Top of the World (2021).

Content
"Getting Good" was written by Emily Weisband and produced by David Garcia.

A new version of the song, recorded as a duet with Trisha Yearwood, was released on June 26, 2020.

Music video
The music video for "Getting Good" premiered on November 26, 2019. Directed by TK McKamy/Roman White, it features Alaina dancing a choreographed routine with her Dancing with the Stars partner Gleb Savchenko around an empty house. It also shows her by herself in certain scenes, such as barefoot by the pool and laying down on a new car.

Charts

Weekly charts

Year-end charts

Certifications

Release history

References

2019 songs
2019 singles
Lauren Alaina songs
Universal Music Group singles
19 Recordings singles
Country ballads
Songs written by Emily Weisband
Mercury Nashville singles